The Covenant of the Crown is a science fiction novel by American writer  Howard Weinstein, part of the Star Trek: The Original Series franchise.

Plot
Spock, McCoy and Kailyn, the beautiful heir to the Shaddan throne are the only survivors of an Enterprise shuttle crash on the barren planet of Sigma 1212. The three must survive Klingon scouts and literally reclaim the Shaddan crown, or else risk a Klingon territorial takeover.

References

External links

Novels based on Star Trek: The Original Series
1981 American novels
American science fiction novels
Novels set in the 23rd century